Gotland is a province, county, municipality, and diocese of Sweden, and Sweden's largest island.

Gotland may also refer to:

Relating to Gotland island 
 Gotland County, an administrative division in Sweden comprising Gotland
 Gotland Municipality, the single municipality in Gotland County
 Gotland official football team

Ships and submarines 
Gotland-class submarine, of the Swedish Navy

, a 1933 seaplane cruiser of the Swedish Navy
MS SNAV Toscana, a cruiseferry ordered as MS Gotland

Animals 
 Gotland pony, an old Swedish pony breed
 Gotland rabbit, a Swedish variety of rabbit
 Gotland (sheep), a breed of domestic sheep named for the Swedish island

See also
Götaland
Gothland (disambiguation)
Duke of Gotland